The Gates of Heaven is a 1945 Italian drama film directed by Vittorio De Sica.

The film was made during the German occupation of Rome, with support from the Vatican. This and another film The Ten Commandments allowed a number of actors, under pressure to go north and work in Venice for the film industry of Mussolini's puppet Italian Social Republic, to remain in Rome.

The film's sets were designed by Salvo D'Angelo who also worked as co-producer. Vittorio de Sica hired approximately 300 extras, who were Jewish or simply being persecuted by the Nazi regime, because of their physical oddity. To avoid their deportation and later execution, he prolonged the shooting of the film as long as he could, awaiting the arrival of the allied armies.

The film won the OCIC Special Award at the 53rd Venice International Film Festival in 1996 for efforts to restore the film.

Plot
This is the story of a train full of sick and deformed pilgrims on their way to seek miracles at the shrine of Our Lady of Loreto, near the city of Ancona in eastern Italy.

Cast
 Marina Berti as La crocerossina
 Elettra Druscovich as Filomena, la governante
 Massimo Girotti as Il giovane cieco
 Roldano Lupi as Giovanni Brandacci, il pianista
 Carlo Ninchi as L'accompagnatore del cieco
 Elli Parvo as La signora provocante
 María Mercader as Maria (as Maria Mercader)
 Cristiano Cristiani as Claudio Gorini, il bambino paralizzato
 Giovanni Grasso as Il commerciante paralitico
 Giuseppe Forcina as L'ingegniere
 Enrico Ribulsi as Uno dei nepoti del commerciante
 Amelia Bissi as La signora Enrichetta
 Annibale Betrone as Il medico del treno bianco
 Tilde Teldi as La contessa crocerossina
 Pina Piovani as La zia del piccolo Claudio
 Giulio Alfieri as Un signore anziano
 Giulio Calì as Il napoletano curioso
  Teresa Mariani    
 Vittorio Cottafavi
 Gildo Bocci

References

Bibliography 
 Gundle, Stephen. Mussolini's Dream Factory: Film Stardom in Fascist Italy. Berghahn Books, 2013.

External links

1945 films
1945 drama films
Italian drama films
1940s Italian-language films
Italian black-and-white films
Films directed by Vittorio De Sica
Films set on trains
Films with screenplays by Cesare Zavattini
Lux Film films
Films scored by Enzo Masetti
1940s Italian films